The 1973 La Flèche Wallonne was the 37th edition of La Flèche Wallonne cycle race and was held on 19 April 1973. The race started in Verviers and finished in Marcinelle. The race was won by André Dierickx of the Flandria team.

General classification

References

1973 in road cycling
1973
1973 in Belgian sport